The Turka are an ethnic group in Burkina Faso. They are part of the Gur people and speak the Turka language ("tuz"), a Gur language. The Turka population is estimated at 48,000-61,000.

References

Ethnic groups in Burkina Faso